Powder Springs is an unincorporated community in Grainger County, Tennessee, United States.

Notes

Unincorporated communities in Grainger County, Tennessee
Unincorporated communities in Tennessee